Midnight's Fire is a fictional supervillain appearing in American comic books published by Marvel Comics. He first appeared in The New Warriors #2 (Aug. 1990), and was created by Fabian Nicieza and Mark Bagley. Midnight's Fire is a Mutant, his powers and his sister Silhouette's powers are derived from their ability to tap into the extradimensional energy of the Universal Wellspring, due to being descendants of the Dragon's Breath Cult which had based their cult around the base of one of the wells for centuries.

Fictional character biography

Origin
In 1966 during the Vietnam War, an American recon patrol in Cambodia stumbled upon the ancient, hidden temple of a cult known as the Dragon's Breath, which had remained hidden for centuries. It had been built upon a well-spring of raw, primal energy called the "Well of All Things". The inhabitants decided to breed a superior race that would one day unite with the ways of the west. They believed that this union would produce children capable of harnessing the power of the Well. The members of the recon patrol were to be the fathers of these children, one of these men was Andrew Chord the man who would become Midnight Fire's and Silhouette's father.

Midnight's Fire and his sister Silhouette are the only children of Andrew Chord, former guardian of Dwayne Taylor (Night Thrasher) and his wife Miyami (daughter of Tai). Silhouette, Midnight's Fire and Dwayne began an organized effort to take down various New York City street gangs, but their partnership ended when Silhouette was shot and paralyzed from the waist down. Midnight's Fire blamed Dwayne and became a cop killer and a druglord in order to lure Dwayne into a physical confrontation he could not possibly win.

Folding Circle
Diego Cassias, one of the other members of the recon patrol now calling himself the Left Hand, stole the power of the Well from his own child, then gathered the other children of the pact including Midnight's Fire into a group called the Folding Circle. The Circle attempted to take control of the Well away from Tai. Members of the Circle, together with the New Warriors, managed to defeat Tai, but the Well was sealed, Cassias and Tai were apparently killed, and the surviving members of the Circle escaped in a stolen Avenger's Quinjet.

The remaining members of the Folding Circle later crashed in Madripoor and attempted to usurp the role of local druglord, which was then held by Aardwolf, a Mutant crimelord. They succeeded, but were later taken down by Night Thrasher and Silhouette.

New Warriors Volume 4
Recently Midnight's Fire returned in the newest volume of 'New Warriors'. He has a face to face meeting with Night Thrasher, whom he still believes is Dwayne but is in fact Donyell, for the purposes of arranging an 'alliance'. Midnight's Fire leaves, telling Night Thrasher he would think about it. It's after the meeting that Midnight's Fire is working on behalf of another individual. He expresses displeasure at working with this entity.

Powers and abilities
Midnight's Fire is a Mutant like his sister Silhouette. His powers come from the Universal Wellspring.
Midnight's Fire has very subtle para-human abilities.  Due to the energies of the Well of All Things his physical attributes are raised to slightly beyond the peak of human possibility.  He thus possesses enhanced speed, strength, agility, endurance and sensory perception slightly superior to Captain America; and he may well surpass these abilities as he grows in age and power. Midnight's Fire also possesses a degree of superhuman resilience; able to at least briefly survive a plunge into a pool of acetone without harm; and to fight an armoured Night Thrasher barehanded without suffering significant harm.
Midnight's Fire is also a skilled martial artist.

References

External links
World of Black Heroes: Midnight's Fire Biography
The Folding Circle
Return of the Folding Circle
Silhouette Biography by Ray Schaff
The New Warriors

Comics characters introduced in 1990
Characters created by Fabian Nicieza
Fictional African-American people
Fictional Asian-American people
Marvel Comics mutates
Marvel Comics martial artists
Marvel Comics supervillains